The 1979–80 Villanova Wildcats men's basketball team represented Villanova University during the 1979–80 NCAA Division I men's basketball season. The head coach was Rollie Massimino. The team played its home games at Villanova Field House in Villanova, Pennsylvania, and was a member of the Eastern Athletic Association.  The team won the regular season Big East title and reached the second round of the NCAA tournament before falling to Syracuse. Villanova finished with a 23–8 record (7–3 Big East).

Roster

Schedule and results

|-
!colspan=9 style=| Regular season

|-
!colspan=9 style=| EAA tournament

|-
!colspan=9 style=| NCAA tournament

Rankings

References

Villanova
Villanova
Villanova Wildcats men's basketball seasons
1979 in sports in Pennsylvania
1980 in sports in Pennsylvania